A by-election for the seat of Vasse in the Western Australian Legislative Assembly was held on 18 October 2014. The by-election was triggered by the resignation of Liberal MLA and former Liberal leader Troy Buswell on 3 September 2014, who won the seat at the 2013 election with a 57.3 percent primary and a 71.2 percent two-party vote. It was held on the same day as the 2014 Casuarina by-election in the Northern Territory.

Candidates
The writ for the by-election was issued on 18 September 2014, and candidate nominations were open until 26 September.

The six candidates in ballot paper order were as follows:

The Labor Party declined to field a candidate at the by-election.

Results

See also
Electoral results for the district of Vasse
List of Western Australian state by-elections

References

External links
2014 Vasse state by-election: Antony Green ABC

2014 elections in Australia
Western Australian state by-elections
2010s in Western Australia